League tables for teams participating in Kolmonen, the fourth tier of the Finnish soccer league system, in 2003.

League tables 2003

Helsinki and Uusimaa

Section 1

Section 2

Section 3

South-East Finland, Kaakkois-Suomi

Central Finland, Keski-Suomi

Eastern Finland, Itä-Suomi

Northern Finland, Pohjois-Suomi

Group A

Group B

Group C

Central Ostrobothnia, Keski-Pohjanmaa

Preliminary stage

Relegation playoff Group
(preliminary stage points included)

Relegation playoff

First Leg
Into          2-2 GBK II

Second Leg
GBK II        3-1 Into

GBK II remain at fourth level.

Vaasa

Preliminary stage

Relegation playoff Group
(preliminary stage points included)

Vaasa/Central Ostrobothnia Promotion Playoff Group

NB: Esse IK withdrew from Promotion Playoff and were replaced by Norrvalla FF.

Satakunta

Tampere

Turku and Åland, Turku and Ahvenanmaa

Promotion Playoff

Promotion Playoff Group A
Round 1
PMP           1-2 TiPS
LPS           bye

Round 2
TiPS          4-1 LPS
PMP           bye

Round 3
LPS           3-1 PMP
TiPS          bye

Final Table:

Promotion Playoff Group B
Round 1
TKT           5-1 EuPa
ÅIFK          bye

Round 2
EuPa          3-1 ÅIFK
TKT           bye

Round 3
ÅIFK          0-5 TKT
EuPa          bye

Table:

Promotion Playoff Group C
Round 1
LehPa         2-1 Huima
MiKi          bye

Round 2
Huima         0-2 MiKi
LehPa         bye

Round 3
MiKi          3-1 LehPa
Huima         bye

Final Table:

Promotion Playoff Group D
Round 1

First Leg - FC Rio Grande 2-1 FC-88

Second Leg - FC-88   1-1 FC Rio Grande

Round 2

First Leg - FC Tarmo   1-2 FC Rio Grande

Second Leg - FC Rio Grande 1-1 FC Tarmo

Round 3

First Leg - Norrvalla FF  3-1 FC Rio Grande

Second Leg - FC Rio Grande 2-0 Norrvalla FF

FC Rio Grande promoted, Norrvalla FF play promotion playoffs.

Division Two/Division Three Playoffs

First Legs
PMP           0-3 Kiffen
Huima         4-2 FCV
Norrvalla FF  awd KaIK [awarded 0-3 due to Norrvalla FF withdrawing]
ÅIFK          2-1 MaPS

Second Legs
Kiffen        5-1 PMP
MaPS          2-0 ÅIFK
FCV           0-1 Huima
KaIK          n/p Norrvalla FF

Huima promoted, FCV relegated.
Kiffen, MaPS and KaIK remain at third level.

Footnotes

References and sources
Finnish FA
ResultCode

Kolmonen seasons
4
Finland
Finland